Tadas  is a village in the southern state of Karnataka,  28Km away From Hubli & 20 km away from Mundgod India It is located in the Shiggaon taluk of Haveri district in Karnataka. Tadas has been fighting for a Taluk level headquarters. Largest city in Shiggoan Taluk, It's developing city in Shiggoan Taluk

Information
2011 census, Tadas had a population of 20000 . Tadas Village is lorgest village in shiggoan taluk,
Population is more than 20000,   Tadas have Best bus connectivity.    2 state highwas, Sh69 & Sh1 passes on Tadas.              Nearest tourism Gayatri Thapobhumi, Agadi Thota, Dundi Basaweswar Temple, Thayavva Temple, Attiveri sanctuary, Bachanaki Dam Etc.

See also
2011 census, Tadas had a population of 20000 . Also Have 250years (1860) old Govt Primary School, built by British govt, it's a oldest school in Taluk. Name of this ancient school called as Sarakari hiriya prathamika kannada Boys School Tadas.
 Haveri
 Districts of Karnataka
 Tadas

References

External links
 http://Haveri.nic.in/

Villages in Haveri district